Set the World on Fire is the first album of collaboration between Hardline vocalist Johnny Gioeli (Axel Rudi Pell, Crush 40) and drummer/vocalist Deen Castronovo (Revolution Saints, The Dead Daisies, ex-Ozzy Osbourne, ex-Steve Vai, ex-Hardline, ex-Bad English, ex-Journey).

Gioeli and Castronovo first played together on the debut Hardline album Double Eclipse in 1992. 25 years later they reunited with Italian songwriter Alessandro Del Vecchio that produced this debut album for Frontiers Records.

Track listing

Personnel

 Johnny Gioeli – Lead vocals
 Deen Castronovo – Lead vocals, drums
 Alessandro Del Vecchio – Keyboards, backing vocals, producing, recording, mixing, mastering
 Mario Percudani – Guitar
 Nik Mazzucconi – Bass

Additional personnel
 Giorgia Colleluori – Lead vocals on "Need You Now"
 Manato Raoul Christian Navarro – additional Acoustic guitars on "Need You Now"
 Serafino Perugino – Executive producer

References

2018 debut albums
Hard rock albums by American artists